The 2008 Jacksonville Jaguars season was the franchise's 14th season in the National Football League and the 6th under head coach Jack Del Rio. The Jaguars failed to improve upon their 11–5 record from 2007 and did not make the playoffs. The Jaguars struggled to a 5–11 finish, the franchise's worst record since 2003.  The team's struggles were in part the result of a rash of injuries to the team's offensive line.  The Jaguars lost starting guards Vince Manuwai and Maurice Williams for the season within the first quarter of the opening game. Tackle Richard Collier's career ended in early September when he was brutally attacked and shot 14 times.  Center Brad Meester missed the first two months of the season and guard Chris Naeole, signed to the roster mid-season in response to these injuries, was injured in pregame warmups before playing a single snap. Against teams with smaller defensive linemen, the 2008 Jaguars offense resembled the 2007 offense because the line was able to dominate.  An example is the 23–21 victory in Indianapolis against the Colts that saw David Garrard drive the Jaguars into field goal range in the final minute, culminating with Josh Scobee booting the game-winning 51-yard field goal. However, the Jaguars overall struggled, especially in the second half of the season, as evidenced by a 19–21 loss to the Bengals, who entered the game with an 0–8 record.

This season marked the end of an era as running back Fred Taylor left the team after 11 seasons.

Draft 

Source:

Trades and free agent signings 
 WR Troy Williamson acquired via trade from the Minnesota Vikings in exchange for a 6th round pick in the 2008 NFL Draft.
 WR Jerry Porter signed as a free agent from the Oakland Raiders.
 CB Drayton Florence acquired as a free agent from the San Diego Chargers.
 QB Cleo Lemon acquired as a free agent from the Miami Dolphins.
 DT Marcus Stroud was traded to the Buffalo Bills in exchange for picks in the third and fifth round of the 2008 NFL Draft.
 WR Ernest Wilford left as a free agent to sign with the Miami Dolphins.
 DE Bobby McCray left as a free agent to sign with the New Orleans Saints.
 S Sammy Knight left as a free agent to sign with the New York Giants.

Richard Collier shooting 
On September 2, 2008, third-year offensive tackle Richard Collier was shot outside an apartment building in Jacksonville while waiting for his girlfriend with a friend of his, former teammate Kenny Pettway, in his Cadillac Escalade.  He was shot 14 times, largely in his lower torso and upper legs.  Five bullets lodged in his bladder, and two struck his spine, severing his spinal cord.  He was critically wounded, and spent three weeks on a ventilator.  He was left paraplegic, as well as having his left leg amputated below the knee due to embolisms.

Final roster

Schedule

Preseason

Regular season
{| class="wikitable" style="text-align:center"
|-
! style=""| Week
! style=""| Date
! style=""| Opponent
! style=""| Result
! style=""| Record
! style=""| Venue
! style=""| Attendance
|-style="background:#fcc;"
! 1
| September 7
| at Tennessee Titans
| L 10–17
| 0–1
| LP Field
| 69,143
|-style="background:#fcc;"
! 2
| September 14
| Buffalo Bills
| L 16–20
| 0–2
| Jacksonville Municipal Stadium
| 65,167
|-style="background:#cfc;"
! 3
| September 21
| at Indianapolis Colts| W 23–21
| 1–2
| Lucas Oil Stadium
| 65,938
|-style="background:#cfc;"
! 4
| September 28
| Houston Texans| W 30–27 
| 2–2
| Jacksonville Municipal Stadium
| 64,061
|-style="background:#fcc;"
! 5
| October 5
| Pittsburgh Steelers
| L 21–26
| 2–3
| Jacksonville Municipal Stadium
| 65,908
|-style="background:#cfc;"
! 6
| October 12
| at Denver Broncos
| W 24–17
| 3–3
| Invesco Field at Mile High
| 75,674
|-
! 7
|colspan="6" align="center"|Bye
|-style="background:#fcc;"
! 8
| October 26
| Cleveland Browns
| L 17–23
| 3–4
| Jacksonville Municipal Stadium
| 64,775
|-style="background:#fcc;"
! 9
| November 2
| at Cincinnati Bengals
| L 19–21
| 3–5
| Paul Brown Stadium
| 64,238
|-style="background:#cfc;"
! 10
| November 9
| at Detroit Lions
| W 38–14
| 4–5
| Ford Field
| 52,631
|-style="background:#fcc;"
! 11
| November 16
| Tennessee Titans| L 14–24
| 4–6
| Jacksonville Municipal Stadium
| 65,258
|-style="background:#fcc;"
! 12
| November 23
| Minnesota Vikings
| L 12–30
| 4–7
| Jacksonville Municipal Stadium
| 65,064
|-style="background:#fcc;"
! 13
| 
| at Houston Texans| L 17–30
| 4–8
| Reliant Stadium
| 70,809
|-style="background:#fcc;"
! 14
| December 7
| at Chicago Bears
| L 10–23
| 4–9
| Soldier Field
| 61,736
|-style="background:#cfc;"
! 15
| December 14
| Green Bay Packers
| W 20–16
| 5–9
| Jacksonville Municipal Stadium
| 65,457
|-style="background:#fcc;"
! 16
| 
| Indianapolis Colts| L 24–31
| 5–10
| Jacksonville Municipal Stadium
| 65,648
|-style="background:#fcc;"
! 17
| December 28
| at Baltimore Ravens
| L 7–27
| 5–11
| M&T Bank Stadium
| 71,366
|}Note: Intra-division opponents are in bold''' text.

Standings

Game summaries

Week 1: at Tennessee Titans

Week 2: vs. Buffalo Bills

Week 3: at Indianapolis Colts

Week 4: vs. Houston Texans

Week 5: vs. Pittsburgh Steelers

Week 6: at Denver Broncos

Week 8: vs. Cleveland Browns

Week 9: at Cincinnati Bengals

Week 10: at Detroit Lions

Week 11: vs. Tennessee Titans

Week 12: vs. Minnesota Vikings

Week 13: at Houston Texans

Week 14: at Chicago Bears

Week 15: vs. Green Bay Packers

Week 16: vs. Indianapolis Colts

Week 17: at Baltimore Ravens

Notes and references

Jacksonville
Jacksonville Jaguars seasons
Jackson